is a Japanese former footballer.

Career statistics

Club

Notes

Managerial statistics

References

1969 births
Living people
People from Sapporo
Sportspeople from Hokkaido
Association football people from Hokkaido
Japanese footballers
J1 League players
Japan Football League players
Shonan Bellmare players
Albirex Niigata players
Jatco SC players
SP Kyoto FC players
Japanese football managers
J3 League managers
Vanraure Hachinohe managers
Association football defenders